Fabian Giuseppe Barbiero (born 2 May 1984) is an Australian footballer who plays for MetroStars, as a central midfielder.

Biography

Club career
Before joining Adelaide United Barbiero played for the North Eastern MetroStars. Barbiero signed for Adelaide in the 2007–08 season making his debut as a substitute against Perth Glory in a 1–1 draw at Hindmarsh Stadium; he went on to make 3 league appearances getting sent off on his full league debut.

With Jonas Salley being classified as a foreigner under new FIFA law Barbiero became a pivotal part in Adelaide's midfield in the AFC Champions League; this including the 3–0, semi-final, win over Bunyodkor where he not only was assigned to mark Rivaldo but also scored the second goal.

His good form did not go unnoticed by coach Aurelio Vidmar as he was handed his second league start in the 1–0 win over Queensland playing just over an hour before being replaced by Alemão.

Barbiero scored his first A-League goal against Newcastle Jets on 9 January 2009 converting from a tight angle to give Adelaide a 1–0 lead. Barbiero scored the Preliminary-Final goal against the Queensland Roar, that got Adelaide into the 2008–09 Grand Final against Melbourne Victory. On 14 April 2009 moved on trial to German Bundesliga club SpVgg Greuther Fürth.

International career
Barbiero made his first senior international debut for the Australian national team on 4 March 2009 in an AFC Cup qualifying match versus Kuwait.

Career statistics

References

External links
 Adelaide United profile 

1984 births
Living people
Association football midfielders
Australian soccer players
Adelaide United FC players
Croydon Kings players
Australian people of Italian descent
A-League Men players
FFSA Super League players
Australia international soccer players
Soccer players from Adelaide
National Premier Leagues players
North Eastern MetroStars SC players